The Expo Square Pavilion, sometimes called simply The Pavilion, and formerly known as the Tulsa Fairgrounds Pavilion, is a 6,311-seat multi-purpose arena, in the Tulsa State Fairgrounds in Tulsa, Oklahoma.

It was built in 1932; the architect was Leland I Shumway. The building is in the PWA Art Deco style, built of blond brick with terra cotta ornamentation, and is considered one of the prime examples of Art Deco architecture in Tulsa.

It was home to the Tulsa Golden Hurricane men's basketball team from 1947 until the opening of the Tulsa Convention Center in 1964, the Tulsa Oilers Central Hockey League team in the 1983–84 season and the Tulsa 66ers, of the NBA Development League, until they moved to the SpiritBank Event Center in 2008. The Tulsa Roughnecks of the NASL used it for indoor soccer until the league's demise in 1984. The Tulsa Crude of the United States Hockey League played there in 2001 and 2002 before folding. It was home to the Tulsa Revolution of MASL for the latter portion of the 2014–15 season, the team's last.

It was also used as the venue for UFC 4, which was held on December 16, 1994.
Currently, it is used for numerous events throughout the year, including the annual Akdar Shrine Circus.

References

External links
 Tulsa Expo Square website - The Pavilion Dead link, February 13, 2022.
 Tulsa Preservation Commission - Fairgrounds Pavilion

Indoor arenas in Oklahoma
Indoor ice hockey venues in the United States
p
Defunct indoor soccer venues in the United States
Buildings and structures in Tulsa, Oklahoma
Sports venues in Tulsa, Oklahoma
Economy of Tulsa, Oklahoma
Defunct NBA G League venues
Mixed martial arts venues in the United States
North American Soccer League (1968–1984) indoor venues
Tulsa 66ers
Tulsa Golden Hurricane men's basketball
Tulsa Oilers (1964–1984)
1932 establishments in Oklahoma
Sports venues completed in 1932
Tulsa State Fair